On 25 March 1799, French and Habsburg armies fought for control of the geographically strategic Hegau in present-day Baden-Württemberg. The battle has been called by various names: First Battle of Stockach, the Battle by Stockach, and, in French chronicles, the Battle of Liptingen (or Leibtengen).

In the broader military context, this battle comprises a keystone in the first campaign in southwestern Germany during the Wars of the Second Coalition, part of the French Revolutionary Wars.  For an explanation of the types of forces, please see Types of military forces in the Napoleonic Wars.

Background
Stockach lies at the junction of east–west and north–south roads on the eastern side of the Black Forest.  Strategically, control of the location offered access between the Swiss and Italian theaters and those in southern, central and northern Germany.  French control would protect access to the Black forest and the Rhine, of strategic importance in the Directory's plans to force the Habsburg army back to Vienna.

The day-long battle at Stockach and Engen pitted the two armies against each other for the second time in seven days.  The Austrians still had the numerical superiority, but this time it was closer to two-to-one, instead of almost three-to-one.  Jourdan had consolidated his force over a shorter line, and had the full Army of the Danube under his direct command.  Charles, likewise, had shortened his line; although Hotze had not yet caught up with the archduke, he and his 10,000 men were approaching from the Austrians' left rear.

Army of the Danube

General of Division Jean-Baptiste Jourdan commanding.
Chief of Staff: General of Division Jean Augustin Ernouf
Engineering: General of Division Armand Samuel de Marescot
Artillery: General of Division Jean Fabre de la Martillière

Advanced Guard

General of Division François Joseph Lefebvre
Adj. General Jean-Baptiste Drouet
Adj. General François-Xavier Octavie Fontaine

Generals of Brigade Jean-de-Dieu Soult, Adolphe Édouard Casimir Joseph Mortier, Anne Gilbert de Laval
25th Demi-brigade Light Infantry (3 battalions)
53rd Demi Brigade Line Infantry (3 battalions)
67th Demi Brigade Line Infantry (3 battalions)

General of Brigade Dominique Louis Antoine Klein
17th Dragoon Regiment
1st Chasseurs à Cheval
4th Hussars (4 squadrons)
5th Hussars (4 squadrons)
2 Foot Artillery Batteries
1 Horse Artillery Battery
3rd Battalion Sappers (7th Company)

First Division

General of Division Pierre Marie Barthélemy Ferino
Pierre Garnier de Laboissière

Left Brigade: Jean-Baptiste Jacopin
102nd Demi Brigade Line Infantry (3 battalions)
6th Chasseurs à Cheval (4 squadrons)

Right Brigade: Jean Victor Tharreau
10th Demi Brigade Light Infantry (3 battalions)
46th Demi Brigade Line Infantry(3 battalions)
11th Dragoon Regiment (4 squadrons)
3 Foot Artillery Batteries
1 Horse Artillery Battery
3rd Battalion Sappers

Second Division

General of Division Joseph Souham

Left Brigade General of Brigade François Goullus
83rd Demi Brigade, Line Infantry (3 battalions)
7th Demi Brigade, Line Infantry (2 battalions)
6th Dragoons (4 squadrons)

Right Brigade General of Brigade Charles Mathieu Isidore Decaen
2nd Demi Brigade, Light Infantry (3 battalions)
1st Dragoons (4 squadrons)
2nd Foot Artillery (15th Company)
7th Horse Artillery Unit (13th Company)

Third Division

General of Division Laurent de Gouvion Saint-Cyr

General of Brigade Frédéric Henri Walther
108th Demi Brigade, Line Infantry (3 battalions)
2nd Dragoon Regiment

General of Brigade Claude Juste Alexandre Legrand
11th Demi Brigade, Light Infantry (2 battalions)
1st Demi Brigade, Line Infantry (2 battalions)
8th Chasseurs à Cheval (4 squadrons)
10th Chasseurs à Cheval (4 squadrons)
2 Foot Artillery Units
1 Horse Artillery Units

Cavalry Reserves

General of Division Jean-Joseph Ange d'Hautpoul
1st Carabiniers Regiment
2nd Carabiniers Regiment
4th Cavalry Regiment
6th Cavalry Regiment
7th Cavalry Regiment
8th Cavalry Regiment
23rd Cavalry Regiment
25th Cavalry Regiment
6th Horse Artillery (5th company)
7th Horse Artillery (2nd company)
3rd Foot Artillery (2nd and 3rd company)
3rd Battalion Sappers

Detached Flank Corps

General of Division Dominique Vandamme
1st Light Infantry (2 battalions)
8th Demi Brigade, light infantry (3 battalions)
50th Demi Brigade, light infantry (3 battalions each)
1 Squadron Dragoons
1 Foot Artillery Unit
8th or 10th Chasseurs a Cheval (1 squadron)

Habsburg Army

Field Marshal Archduke Charles Commander in Chief

Advanced Guard

Lt. Field Marshal Friedrich Joseph, Count of Nauendorf
Major General  Maximilian, Count of Merveldt

Major General Merveldt
Freikorps (independent corps) Wurmser (12 companies)
1st Hussars Kaiser (8 squadrons)
1st Lancers Merveldt (8 squadrons)
13th Border Infantry Regiment Wallachian Illyrian (1st Battalion)

 Major General Joseph Kempf (commanded a portion of Petrasch's division, included in the advanced guard)
1st Infantry Regiment Kaiser (3 battalions)
31st Infantry Regiment Benjowsky (2 battalions)

Right Wing
Feldzeugmeister Olivier, Count of Wallis

Lt. Field Marshal Karl Aloys zu Fürstenberg
Colonel Joseph Ulm
35th Infantry Regiment Wenkheim (3 battalions)

Major General Ludwig von Vogelsang
21st Infantry Regiment Gemmingen (3 battalions)
42nd Infantry Regiment Erbach (2 battalions)

Lt. Field Marshal Franz, Baron von Petrasch
Major General Kempf
Two regiments detached to advance guard
49th Infantry Regiment Kerpen (2 battalions)

Lt. Field Marshal Augustus Christian Frederick, Duke of Anhalt-Köthen
Major General Andreas O'Reilly von Ballinlough
6th Light Dragoons Coburg (6 squadrons)
Major General Franz Roë (or Anton?)
2nd Light Dragoons, Archduke Ferdinand (6 squadrons)

Lt. Field Marshal Johann Sigismund Riesch
Major General Frederick Louis, Prince of Hohenlohe-Ingelfingen
9th Cuirassier Regiment Nassau-Usingen (6 squadrons)
10th Cuirassier Regiment Mack (6 squadrons)

Center

Reinforced Forward Line
Lt. Field Marshal Nauendorf
12th Infantry Regiment Manfredini (3 battalions)

Major General Ignaz Gyulai
6th Border Infantry Regiment Warasdin St. George (1st Battalion)
8th Border Infantry Regiment Gradiska (3rd Battalion)
16th Border Infantry Regiment Siebenburg-Wallachian (1st Battalion)

Major General Michael von Kienmayer
3rd Hussars Erzherzog Karl d'Este (8 squadrons)
10th Hussars Meszaros (8 squadrons)

Major General Christoph Karl von Piacsek
Tirolean Jägers (3 companies)
5th Light Battalion Radivojevich (6 companies)
12th Border Hussars Croatian Slavic (6 squadrons)

Lt. Field Marshal Siegfried Kospoth (of the Reserve)
Major General Joseph Spiegelberg
12th Light Dragoons Kinsky (6 squadrons)

Major General Friedrich Joseph Ludwig of Hessen-Homburg
 11th Light Dragoons Latour (6 squadrons)

Major General Franz Ludwig Sebottendorf
2nd Infantry Regiment Archduke Ferdinand (3 battalions)

Reserve

Lt. Field Marshal Vinzenz Kolowrat-Liebsteinsky
Grenadier Battalion Tegethoff (20th, 22nd, and 29th)
Grenadier Battalion Bojaowsky (1st 7th and 12th)
Grenadier Battalion Teschner (3rd, 35th and 50th)
Grenadier Battalion Lippe (2nd, 31st and 60th)
Grenadier Battalion Sebottendorf (41st, 49th and 56th)
Grenadier Battalion Juch (21st, 42, and 54th)

Left Wing
Lt. Field Marshal Joseph Staader

Advanced Guard
Major General Karl Philipp Fürst zu Schwarzenberg
Border Sharpshooters (4 companies)
12th Light battalion Rubinitz (6 companies)
2nd Lancers (6 squadrons)
4th Hussar Regiment Vecsey (6 squadrons)

Main Force (Left)
Lt. Field Marshal Louis-Willibrord-Antoine Baillet de Latour
Major General Anton Ulrich Mylius
12th Border Infantry Regiment Banat (1st Battalion)
22nd Infantry Regiment Lacy (3 battalions)
7th Infantry Regiment Carl Schroeder (3 battalions)

Lt. Field Marshal Prince Heinrich XV of Reuss-Plauen
Major General Karl Friedrich von Lindenau
3rd Infantry Regiment Erzherzog Karl (3 battalions)
29th Infantry Regiment Oliver Wallis (3 battalions)

Lt. Field Marshal Nikolaus Colloredo-Mels
Major General Prince Franz Seraph of Rosenberg-Orsini
7th Cuirassiers Lothringen (6 squadrons)
8th Cuirassiers Hohenzollern (6 squadrons)

Lt. Field Marshal Alexander of Württemberg
Major General Johann Jacob Klinglin
2nd Cuirassiers Archduke Franz d'Este  (6 squadrons)
11th Cuirassiers Ansbach (4 squadrons)

Detached (flanking) force
Lt. Colonel Wiedersberg
Tirolean Jägers (1 company)
1st Border Hussars Croatian Slavic (4 squadrons)
7th Light Dragoons Waldeck (2 squadrons)

Sources

Bibliography
Source for Orders of Battle:
 Kessinger, Roland. '"Die Schlacht von Stockach am 25. Maerz 1799". Zeitschrift für Militärgeschichte. Salzburg: Öst. Milizverlag, 1997-. [2006].

Other information:
Alison, Sir Archibald.  A History of Europe from the Commencement of the French Revolution in 1789 to the Restoration of the Bourbons. New York: A.S. Barnes, 1850.
Blanning, Timothy,  The French Revolutionary Wars, New York: Oxford University Press, 1996.  
Bruce, Robert R. Fighting techniques of the Napoleonic Age, 1792–1815. London: Thomas Dunne (St. Martin's Press), 2008, 978-0312375874
Deans, William. A History of France from earliest times to the present. V. 2, London: Thomas Jack, 1882.
Dodge, Theodore Ayrault. Napoleon: A History of the Art of War. Volume 3, Boston: Houghton Mifflin Co, 1904.
 Jens-Florian Ebert. "Feldmarschall-Leutnant Fürst zu Fürstenberg,"  Die Österreichischen Generäle 1792-1815. Accessed 7 October 2009.
Gallagher, John, Napoleon's enfant terrible: General Dominique Vandamme. Tulsa, University of Oklahoma Press, 2008, .

Phipps, Ramsey Weston. The Armies of the First French Republic. volume 5: "The armies of the Rhine in Switzerland, Holland, Italy, Egypt and the coup d'etat of Brumaire, 1797–1799." Oxford: Oxford University Press, 1939.

Seaton, Albert. The Austro-Hungarian army of the Napoleonic wars. London: Osprey, 1973, 9780850451474.
Smith, Digby. The Greenhill Napoleonic Wars Data Book: Actions and Losses in Personnel, Colours, Standards and Artillery, 1792–1815, Greenhill, PA, Stackpole, 1998, 
Biographies of Austrian generals by Smith, Digby and Kudrna, Leopold
Thiers, Adolphe.  The history of the French revolution, New York, Appleton, 1854, v. 4,
Young, John, D.D.  A History of the Commencement, Progress, and Termination of the Late War between Great Britain and France which continued from the first day of February 1793 to the first of October 1801. In two volumes.  Edinburg: Turnbull, 1802, vol. 2.

French Revolutionary Wars
French Revolutionary Wars orders of battle